Ralph Kellard (June 16, 1883 - 1955) was an actor in the U.S. who appeared in theatrical productions and films. His film work included leading roles in several films such as The Shielding Shadow (1916), The Restless Sex (1920) and The Cost (film). His son Robert Kellard also became an actor.

He was born Thomas J. J. Kelly in New York City.

Kellard was referred to as a popular local matinee idol of the Auditorium Stock Company in Kansas when he returned on screen in a showing of The Cost (film) in 1920. In 1915 Kellard was voted the second most handsome film star, and shown in a photograph of "this month's prominent film stars" in Motion Picture Classic.

Kellard appeared in the French language publication Mon Ciné on June 28, 1923. Images of Kellard are available at GettyImages, The Wisconsin Historical Society, and The Silent Film Still Archive.

Kellard ate a mostly fruit diet and caused slip and fall problems leaving fruit peels and other bits of fruit waste around studio sets.

Theater
The Warrens of Virginia (play) (1907), as Gen. Carr
Rebecca of Sunnybrook Farm (play) (1907)
The Second Tanqueray starring Tallulah Bankhead at the Amerhurst Drama Festival in 1940.
The Skin of Our Teeth (1942)

Filmography
Her Mother's Secret (1915)
The Precious Parcel (1916)
The Shielding Shadow (1916), a serial
Pearl of the Army (1916), a serial, as Captain
The Hillcrest Mystery (1918), as Gordon Brett
 A Scream in the Night (1919)
The Restless Sex (1920), as Jim Cleland
The Cost (film) (1920), as John Dumont
The Master Mind (1920 film), as Wainwright
Veiled Marriage (1920)
Love, Hate and a Woman (1921)
 Who's Cheating? (1924), Larry Fields
Virtuous Liars (1924),  as Jack Banton
Women Everywhere (1930), as Michael Kopulos

References

External links

1883 births
1955 deaths
Male actors from New York City
American male film actors